Pâté is a short film by Agnieszka Wojtowicz-Vosloo. The film premiered at the Sundance Film Festival and went on to win several prestigious awards including NYU's Wasserman Award, the Fielle d'Or at the Beverly Hills Film Festival, The Grand Jury Prize at the WorldFest Houston International Film Festival, Award for Excellence from New York Magazine and the Special Jury Prize at the Atlanta Film Festival.

Plot
Pâté is a dark story about an aristocratic family struggling to survive in a post-apocalyptic world. Amongst a landscape of desolation, two young children, Otto and his sister Vera, hunt daily for food. Meanwhile, at home in an abandoned ship, their delusional Mother clings onto the faded glory of their former aristocratic lives, aided by her shiftless Maid.

Full of memories, their life is a shadow of the past as each character copes with the grind of daily survival. When the malevolent Mister Griswald, the only man to survive the apocalypse, drops in for dinner, he sets in motion the final act - revealing the shocking secret of their survival.

Cast
 Jane Culley as the Mother
 Ty Arnold as Otto
 Samantha Browne-Walters as Vera
 Gary Swanson as Mr. Griswald
 Barbara Pitcher as the Maid

References

External links
 

2001 films
2001 drama films
2001 short films
2000s English-language films